The riffle chub (Algansea aphanea) is a species of freshwater fish in the family Cyprinidae that is endemic to the Armería, Ayutla and Tuxpan river basins in Jalisco and Colima of west-central Mexico.

References

Algansea
Fish described in 1978
Freshwater fish of Mexico
Endemic fish of Mexico